Four Lane Ends is the name of several locations in England:

 Four Lane Ends Interchange, a metro station in East Newcastle upon Tyne
 Four Lane Ends, Lancashire, a road junction in Thornton-Cleveleys
 Four Lane Ends, a district within the ward of Richmond, South Yorkshire
 Four Lane Ends, a hamlet near Tiverton, Cheshire